Barnaba may refer to:
Barnaba Cagnoli, 14th-century Italian friar from Vercelli
Barnaba da Modena, Italian painter of the mid-14th century Lombardy

See also 
 Banaba (disambiguation)
 San Barnaba (disambiguation)